Augustino is a masculine given name. Notable people with the name include:

Augustino de Cazalla (1510–1559), Spanish clergyman
Augustino Jadalla Wani, South Sudanese politician
Augustino Marial, Sudanese boxer
Augustino Masele (born 1966), Tanzanian politician
Augustino Mrema (born 1944), Tanzanian politician
Augustino Oldoini (1612–1683), Italian Jesuit teacher, church historian and bibliographer
Augustino Ramadhani (1945–2020), Tanzanian jurist and Christian leader

See also
Augustinos Kapodistrias (1778–1857), Greek soldier and politician
Agostino (disambiguation)
Augustine (disambiguation)
Agustini
Augustina

Masculine given names